Kaminer is a surname. Notable people with the surname include:

 Isaac Kaminer (1834–1901), Russian poet, satirist, and physician
 Manó Kertész Kaminer, best known as Michael Curtiz (1886–1962),  Hungarian-American film director
 Joe Kaminer (born 1934), South African rugby union player
 Wendy Kaminer (born 1949), American feminist and human rights activist and lawyer
 Wladimir Kaminer (born 1967), Russian-born German writer

Jewish surnames